USS Dolphin may refer to:

, a cutter in commission during 1777
, a schooner in commission from 1821 to 1835
, a brig intermittently in and out of commission from 1836 to 1860
, a gunboat and dispatch vessel intermittently in and out of commission from 1885 to 1921
, a fishing vessel examined for potential naval use in 1917 but apparently never taken over by the Navy
, a patrol vessel in commission during 1918
, a submarine in commission from 1932 to 1945
, a research and development submarine in commission from 1968 to 2007

United States Navy ship names